FC Arsenal-2 Kyiv was a Ukrainian football team based in Kyiv, Ukraine. The club has been featured regularly in the Ukrainian Second Division it serves as a junior team for the FC Arsenal Kyiv franchise. Like most tributary teams, the best players are sent up to the senior team, meanwhile developing other players for further call-ups.

References

FC Arsenal Kyiv
Football clubs in Kyiv
Defunct football clubs in Ukraine
Association football clubs established in 2003
Association football clubs disestablished in 2004
2003 establishments in Ukraine
2004 disestablishments in Ukraine
Ukrainian reserve football teams